Dino Miguel Castagno (born 8 July 1993) is an Argentine professional footballer who plays as a centre-back.

Career
Castagno played for Fundación Pozo del Molle from the age of six, prior to concurrently appearing for Club Deportivo Argentino from 2001. He joined Boca Juniors in 2006, subsequently appearing at the 2012 U-20 Copa Libertadores. In 2012–13, after he was an unused substitute for fixtures with San Lorenzo and Colón, Castagno made his professional debut on 26 May 2013 during a 4–0 loss to Newell's Old Boys; he featured one more time against La Plata's Gimnasia y Esgrima in the succeeding campaign. In January 2015, Castagno joined Guillermo Brown of Primera B Nacional on loan. One appearance came.

In January 2017, Deportivo Español signed Castagno. His first goal came in October 2018 versus Fénix in Primera B Metropolitana. Castagno spent 2019–20 with San Salvador de Jujuy's Gimnasia y Esgrima, though didn't feature in Primera B Nacional prior to being released in June 2020. At the start of 2021, he played five matches for San Martín in Torneo Regional Federal Amateur. In March 2021, Castagno saw a move to Concepción del Uruguay with Gimnasia y Esgrima fall through due to a failed medical.

Career statistics
.

References

External links

1993 births
Living people
Sportspeople from Córdoba Province, Argentina
Argentine footballers
Association football defenders
Argentine Primera División players
Argentine people of Italian descent
Primera Nacional players
Primera B Metropolitana players
Boca Juniors footballers
Guillermo Brown footballers
Deportivo Español footballers
Gimnasia y Esgrima de Jujuy footballers
San Martín de Mendoza footballers